Khurshid was a Justanid king who ruled briefly over Daylam in 865. He was the son and successor of Vahsudan of Daylam. Right after his accession, because of his opposition to his Alid overlord, he was deposed by the Alid Hasan ibn Zayd, who then made Khurshid's brother Justan III the new ruler of the Justanid dynasty.

Sources 
 

865 deaths
9th-century Iranian people
Justanids
Year of birth unknown